Usi County is a kun, or county, in westernmost Chagang Province, North Korea.  It looks across the Yalu River into the People's Republic of China.  Within North Korea, it borders Chosan and Kopung to the east, Songwon to the south, and North Pyongan Province's Pyoktong county to the west. Originally part of Pyoktong, it was made a separate county in 1952 as part of a general reorganization of local government; in 1954, it was transferred from North Pyongan to Chagang.

There are no railroads in Usi, but it is connected by road to the neighboring districts of Chosan and Pyoktong, and beyond Pyoktong to Sinuiju.  In addition, the Yalu is used for transportation. The stretch of the Yalu in Usi is part of the massive "Lake Supung", North Korea's largest reservoir.

The Yalu valley is farmed for rice, while the upland regions produce maize, potatoes, and sesame.  There is little manufacturing. The county's Kaha-ri district is known for its medicinal waters.

Administrative divisions
Usi county is divided into one town (ŭp), one worker's district (rodongjagu), and 22 villages (ri).

See also
Geography of North Korea
Administrative divisions of North Korea

External links

Counties of Chagang